Jong FC Twente (English: Young FC Twente) are the reserve team of FC Twente, a team from Enschede which played in the Eerste Divisie from 2013 to 2015.

Staff 
 Head coach: Michel Jansen
 Assistant coach: Boudewijn Pahlplatz
 Teammanager: Henny Nijboer
 Physio: Bas Oostvogel

Jong FC Twente
Dutch reserve football teams